Dubravko Mataković (18 January 1942 – 15 October 2019) was a Yugoslav slalom canoeist who competed from the mid-1960s to the early 1980s. He finished 25th in the K-1 event at the 1972 Summer Olympics in Munich.

References
Dubravko Mataković's profile at Sports Reference.com
Dubravko Mataković's obituary 

1942 births
2019 deaths
Canoeists at the 1972 Summer Olympics
Olympic canoeists of Yugoslavia
Yugoslav male canoeists